Acanthocobitis (Paracanthocobitis) adelaideae also known as the checkerboard zipper loach is a species of ray-finned fish in the genus, or subgenus, Paracanthocobitis. This species is known from the
Irrawaddy basin of northern Myanmar.

References

adelaideae
Fish described in 2015
Taxa named by Randal Anthony Singer
Taxa named by Lawrence M. Page